Milanville Historic District, is a national historic district located at Damascus Township, Wayne County, Pennsylvania. The district includes 17 contributing buildings in the community of Milanville.  The buildings were built between 1850 and 1910, and are vernacular interpretations of a variety of popular architectural styles including Greek Revival and Queen Anne.  Notable buildings include the Phone Company Building, Milanville Store (c. 1850), Milanville School (c. 1880), Volney Skinner House (c. 1840), Weston Skinner House (c. 1870), Frank Davis House (c. 1900), Milton Skinner House (c. 1910), Nathan Skinner House (1815), and Milanville Methodist Church (1910).  The Milanville-Skinners Falls Bridge is located in the district.

It was added to the National Register of Historic Places in 1993.

References

Historic districts on the National Register of Historic Places in Pennsylvania
Greek Revival architecture in Pennsylvania
Queen Anne architecture in Pennsylvania
Buildings and structures in Wayne County, Pennsylvania
National Register of Historic Places in Wayne County, Pennsylvania